The Qingtoushan Formation is a Middle Permian-age geologic formation in the Qilian Mountains of Gansu, China. It is known for its diverse tetrapod fauna known as the Dashankou fauna, which likely dates to the Roadian, and includes some of the oldest known therapsids. This formation was previously erroneously named as the Xidagou Formation, a name which applies to otherwise Triassic strata in the northern Qillian Mountains. The formation is over 300 metres thick, and primarily consists of purple-red coarse sandstones, with minor purple mudstone.

Paleobiota

Synapsida

Sauropsida

Chronisuchia

Temnospondyli

References

Geologic formations of China
Permian System of Asia